Sir John Charles Ready Colomb,  (1 May 1838 – 27 May 1909) was a British naval strategist and politician.

Life
Colomb was born in Onchan, Isle of Man, the son of General George Thomas Colomb (1787–1874), and was the younger brother of British Vice-Admiral Philip Howard Colomb. He was educated privately, and entered the Royal Naval College from which he passed out in 1854 into the Royal Marine Artillery. After being variously employed with the Navy, Army, Militia and Volunteers he retired in 1869 with the rank of captain. He thenceforth devoted himself to the study of naval and military problems, on which he had already published some essays.

His books on Colonial Defence and Colonial Opinions (1873), The Defence of Great and Greater Britain (1879), Naval Intelligence and the Protection of Commerce (1881), The Use and the Application of Marine Forces (1883), Imperial Federation: Naval and Military (1887), followed later by other similar works, made him well known among the rising school of Imperialists, and he was elected to parliament in 1886 as Conservative member for Bow and Bromley (1886–1892), and afterwards (1895–1906) for Great Yarmouth. In the 1895-1900 Parliament, he was Chair of the Imperial Federation Defence Committee.

In 1887 he was created CMG, and in 1888 . He became a large landowner, when he inherited the Dromquinna estate with 4,500 acres in the barony of Dunkerron South (Kerry, Ireland) from his father-in-law Robert Samuel Palmer. There in the townland of Templenoe outside Kenmare he commissioned the architect James Franklin Fuller around 1890 to build Dromquinna House. Colomb became a member of the Irish privy council in 1903 and in 1906 sat on the Royal Commission dealing with congested districts. He was also a Deputy Lieutenant and a Justice of Peace for the county; and in 1895 served as High Sheriff of Kerry. John Colomb was a member of the Carlton Club (then Pall Mall, today St James's Street, London). Being ill for some time, he died, aged 71, after an operation on 27 May 1909 at his London residence, 75 Belgrave Road.

Family
Colomb married on 1 January 1866, to Emily Anna, daughter of Robert Samuel Palmer (1802–1891), and widow of Charles Augustus Francis Paget (1832–64), Lieutenant of the Royal Navy and grandson of the first Marquess of Anglesey. They had three children:
 Laura Olivia (1866–1944): Married in 1894 Ruthven Frederic Ruthen-Smith (1864–1955), Britain's ambassador to Switzerland at the beginning of the 20th century and an investor. He was the son of Frederick Chatfield Smith, head of the Smith's Bank in Nottingham;
 Rupert Palmer Colomb (1868–1955): He was Member of Parliament (M.P.) of the "United Kingdom of Great Britain and Ireland" and High Sheriff of Kerry in 1917. He was invested as a "Companion" of the "Order of the Bath" (C.B.). He married Mabel Louisa Mordaunt (1869–1958), daughter of John Murray Mordaunt (1837–1923), Justice of the peace (J.P.);
 Gwendaline Rose Emily (1876–1966): Married in 1900 the judge Sir Thomas Mordaunt Snagge (1868–1955), knighted 1931. Their son was the British newsreader and commentator on BBC Radio John Snagge (1904–1996).

Works

Notes

References

Columb, J.C.R., The Defense of Great and Greater Britain: Sketches of Its Naval, Military and Political Aspects, E. Stanford, 1880, 264 pages.
d'Egville, Howard, Imperial Defence and Closer Union: A Short Record of the Life Work of Sir John Colomb and of the Movement Toward Imperial Organization, London, 1913.
Schurman, D. M., The Education of a Navy: The Development of British Naval Strategic Thought 1867–1914, London, 1965, pp. 16–35.
Kennedy, Greg, Neilson, Keith and Schurman, D.M., eds., Far-Flung Lines: Essays on Imperial Defence in Honour of Donald Mackenzie Schurman, London: Frank Cass, 1997, pp. 31–34.
Gat, Azar, A History of Military Thought Oxford University Press, 2002, pp. 474–477.
Hobson, Rolf, Imperialism at Sea, Brill. 2002. pp. 87–90.

External links 
 
 
 About the Hon. Sir John Charles Ready Colomb, K.C.M.G., P.C. at http://www.anatpro.com
 The Obituary Book – COLOMB, Sir John Charles Ready (1838–1909)

1838 births
1909 deaths
Manx people
Knights Commander of the Order of St Michael and St George
Royal Marines officers
Members of the Privy Council of Ireland
Members of the Parliament of the United Kingdom for English constituencies
Conservative MPs
UK MPs 1886–1892
UK MPs 1895–1900
UK MPs 1900–1906
Politics of the Borough of Great Yarmouth
High Sheriffs of Kerry